Johannes Martin "Joe" Klotsche (November 28, 1907 – 4 February 1995), was an American professor of history and the first chancellor of the University of Wisconsin–Milwaukee, serving as the chief executive of the school and its predecessors from 1946 to 1973.

A native of Scribner, Nebraska, Klotsche was a high school graduate at age 13 and a college graduate at 17; he earned his M.A. at the University of Nebraska in 1928. He got his Ph.D. in history from the University of Wisconsin in 1931 and came to Milwaukee to teach at what was then Wisconsin State Teachers College-Milwaukee, a small teachers college with an enrollment of 1700. He became President of the college in the fall of 1946, when he was 38. It was renamed Wisconsin State College-Milwaukee in 1951, and Klotsche's title was changed to Provost). In 1956, the college was merged with the University of Wisconsin-Extension's Milwaukee center to form the University of Wisconsin-Milwaukee, with Klotsche remaining as provost. In 1965, his title was changed to Chancellor. After his retirement as chancellor in 1973, he remained on the faculty of the History Department until 1978.

Klotsche's administration oversaw UWM's growth from a small teacher's college to a major university: enrollment increase from 1,700 to almost 25,000; construction or purchase of more than 20 major buildings (not counting off-campus buildings); and the establishment of ten schools and colleges. The Klotsche Center for Physical Education on the UWM campus is named for him.

He earned a reputation as a strong supporter of student and faculty rights, often taking strong stands to defend them. Klotsche displayed a continued interest in foreign policy by directing events for the Institute of World Affairs in Geneva; Paris; and Salisbury, Connecticut; and by helping the U.S. Office of Education organize a school-community project in Germany. He also served as the president of the Wisconsin Academy of Sciences, Arts and Letters.

Klotsche's real first name was Johannes, but this fact was not widely known. Officially he was known as "J. Martin Klotsche," and informally as "Joe." After his retirement from teaching, Klotsche and his wife, Roberta Roberts Klotsche, lived for some time in Arizona; after her death, he returned to Wisconsin, living in Oostburg in Sheboygan County.

Quotes
 On his own name
Everyone has always called me Joe. Friends, family, everyone. Only my mother ever called me Johannes.
 On UWM growth
In 1946, this was primarily a teachers college with a limited enrollment of 1,700, a faculty of 80 or 90, two buildings, and that was it. This was a serene, peaceful community. There were no parking problems.
 On UWM's unique position as Wisconsin's urban university
[I]ts urban location was clearly its unique opportunity, and its special responsibilities, consequent upon this location, became more and more important.
 On 1960-1970s student activism
We had never had anything like that at any time. Clearly it was, in terms of student activism, the high point in that whole period.
 On his job
I wouldn't trade the experience, not for anything.
 On intelligence
Intelligence is derived from two words—inter and legere—inter meaning 'between' and legere meaning 'to choose.' An intelligent person, therefore, is one who has learned 'to choose between.' He knows that good is better than evil, that confidence should supersede fear, that love is superior to hate, that gentleness is better than cruelty, forbearance than intolerance, compassion than arrogance, and that truth has more virtue than ignorance.
On Thomas Jefferson and truth
Thomas Jefferson spoke of certain truths as self-evident. He did not say that these truths were self-explanatory or that they were self-operating.

Books
The Role of the United States in World Affairs 1940
The United States and Latin America  1940
The Urban university and the Future of Our Cities 1966
The University of Wisconsin–Milwaukee, An Urban University 1972
Confessions of an educator : my personal and professional memoirs 1985
Together We Travelled 1986
Then and Now : Views of an Educator 1987
A Woman of Courage: The Life and Times of Annette Roberts (w/ Roberta Roberts Klotsche) 1988
Life Begins at Eighty (w/ Adolph A. Suppan) 1991
The University of Wisconsin–Milwaukee : A Historical Profile, 1885-1992 (by Frank A. Cassell, J. Martin Klotsche, and Frederick I. Olson, with the assistance of Donald R. Shea and Bea Bourgeois) 1992

References

External links
UWM official website
Past chancellors of UWM
Obituary
U. of Nebraska alumni article

1907 births
1995 deaths
Chancellors of the University of Wisconsin-Milwaukee
Writers from Nebraska
University of Nebraska alumni
People from Scribner, Nebraska
Writers from Milwaukee
20th-century American historians
20th-century American male writers
People from Oostburg, Wisconsin
Historians from Wisconsin
American male non-fiction writers
20th-century American academics